Albert Tokinirina Rafetraniaina (born 9 September 1996) is a Malagasy professional footballer who plays as a defender or defensive midfielder.

Career
Rafetraniaina made his professional debut on 6 October 2012 appearing as a substitute in a 3–1 defeat to Reims.

On 16 August 2019, he signed for Serie C team Bisceglie. He debuted following 25 August to become first Malagasy footballer to have played professionally in Italy.

International career
A former youth international for France, Rafetraniaina represented the Madagascar national football team in a friendly 0–0 tie with Togo on 21 March 2018.

Career statistics

Club

Notes

References

External links
 
 
 
 

1996 births
Living people
People from Analamanga
Association football defenders
Malagasy footballers
Madagascar international footballers
French footballers
France youth international footballers
French sportspeople of Malagasy descent
OGC Nice players
Red Star F.C. players
A.S. Bisceglie Calcio 1913 players
Ligue 1 players
Ligue 2 players
Serie C players
Malagasy expatriate footballers
Expatriate footballers in Italy